Indah Dewi Pertiwi (born January 30, 1991) is an Indonesian singer, dancer, and artist. Her first single Baru Aku Tahu Cinta Itu Apa was a commercial success, and her first album Hipnotis released a few months later sold over 2 million copies 18 months after its official release through KFC stores in Indonesia. The Indonesian World Records Museum (MURI) named Hipnotis as the fastest selling CD album in Indonesia, and placed #5 on the list of Indonesian all time best selling albums.

Her follow-up album, Teman Ter-Indah was moderately successful. It included the singles Aku Tak Berdaya and Gerakkan Badanmu, which incorporates elements of tango. An accompanying music video for Gerakkan Badanmu was choreographed by Luam Keflezgy, a choreographer who previously worked with artists such as Beyoncé, Alicia Keys, Britney Spears, and Rihanna. Teman Ter-Indah has since sold around 300,000 copies in Indonesia.

Modelling career
Before becoming a singer, in 2007, Pertiwi was a magazine photo model, using the pseudonym "Nell".

Discography

Albums
 Hipnotis (2010)
 Senandung Ramadhan (2010)
 Hipnotis, Entertainment Edition (2010)
 Teman Ter-Indah (2012)
 7icons & Friends (2013)
 KFC Adu Bintang (2013)
 DejaVu (2015)
 Teman Terindah & BFF (2013)

Singles
 Baru Aku Tahu Cinta Itu Apa (2010)
 Jangan Sedih (2010)
 Gejolak Cinta (feat. Sandhy Sondoro) (2010)
 Hipnotis (2010)
 Aku Tak Berdaya (2012)
 Gerakkan Badanmu (2012)
 Tentang Aku dan Dia (2012)
 Teman Ter-Indah (2012)
 BFF-Teman Terindah (ft. Super7) (2013)
 Kembali Kepadamu (feat. 3Composer) (2014)
 Curiga (2014)
 Dulu (2015)
 Kangen (2015)
 Meninggalkanmu (2015)
 Kasih Tak Sampai (2015)
 Mengapa Cinta (2015)
 Risalah Hati (2015)
 Semua Tak Sama (2015)
 Hidup Yang Sepi (2015)
 Bunga Di Tepi Jalan (2015)
 Semua Jadi Satu (2015) (feat. Richard Schrijver) (bonus track)

Awards and nominations

References

External links 
  Situs resmi
  Indah Dewi Pertiwi Siap "Menghipnotis
  Mencari Dancer Untuk IDP

21st-century Indonesian women singers
Indonesian pop singers
Indonesian female dancers
1991 births
People from Bandung
Living people